Jaroslava Komárková (married name Křítková; 23 April 1927 – 26 October 2010) was a Czech athlete. She competed in the women's shot put at the 1948 Summer Olympics and the 1952 Summer Olympics.

References

1927 births
2010 deaths
Athletes (track and field) at the 1948 Summer Olympics
Athletes (track and field) at the 1952 Summer Olympics
Czech female shot putters
Olympic athletes of Czechoslovakia
Sportspeople from České Budějovice